Masoud Mobaraki (born 31 May 1953) is an Iranian former cyclist. He competed in the 1000m time trial event at the 1976 Summer Olympics.

References

External links
 

1953 births
Living people
Iranian male cyclists
Olympic cyclists of Iran
Cyclists at the 1976 Summer Olympics
Place of birth missing (living people)
20th-century Iranian people